(Oh God, how much heartache), 3, is a church cantata by Johann Sebastian Bach. He composed the chorale cantata in Leipzig for the Second Sunday after Epiphany and first performed it on 14 January 1725. It is based on the hymn published by Martin Moller in 1587.

Bach composed the cantata in his second year as Thomaskantor in Leipzig as part of cantata cycle of chorale cantatas, for the second Sunday after Epiphany. The work is based on a hymn without evident connection to the prescribed readings. It is a meditation on Jesus as a comforter in distress,  based on a medieval model. An unknown librettist reworked the ideas of the 18 stanzas in six movements, retaining the words of stanzas 1, 2 and 18 as movements 1, 2 and 6. Similarly, Bach retained the choral melody in three movements, set as a chorale fantasia in the opening chorus with the bass singing the cantus firmus, as a four-part setting with interspersed recitatives in the second movement, and in the closing chorale. He scored the cantata for two oboes d'amore, strings and continuo, with an added trobone to support the bass in the first movement, and a horn to support the soprano in the last movement.

History and words 
Bach composed the cantata in his second year as Thomaskantor in Leipzig as part of his second annual cycle, planned to consist only of chorale cantatas based on Lutheran hymns. He wrote the cantata for the Second Sunday after Epiphany. The prescribed readings for the Sunday were taken from the Epistle to the Romans (we have several gifts – ) and from the Gospel of John (the Marriage at Cana – ).

The cantata is a chorale cantata based on the hymn "" in 18 stanzas attributed to Martin Moller (1587). It is a paraphrase of the Latin "", a medieval hymn attributed to Bernard of Clairvaux, a meditation on Jesus as a comforter and helper in distress. The unknown librettist retained the words of stanzas 1, 2 and 18 as movements 1, 2 and 6. In movement 2, stanza 2 is expanded by paraphrases of stanzas 3–5, while movement 3 is a paraphrase of stanza 6; movement 4 incorporates ideas from stanzas 7–14, and movement 5 relies on stanzas 15 and 16. In movement 2, stanza 2 is expanded by paraphrases of stanzas 3–5. Movement 3 is a paraphrase of stanza 6. Movement 4 incorporates ideas from stanzas 7–14. Movement 5 relies on stanzas 15 and 16. The poet did not relate his text to the reading from John 1:2.

Bach led the first performance of the cantata on 14 January 1725.

Scoring and structure 
Bach structured the cantata in six movements. An opening chorus and a closing chorale frame a sequence of alternating recitatives and arias. The first recitative is unusual: the chorus sings one line of the hymn's four lines, continued each time by a soloist in words of the poet. The last aria is a duet. Bach scored the work for four vocal soloists (soprano (S), alto (A), tenor (T), bass (B)), a four-part choir and a Baroque instrumental ensemble of horn (Co) to double the cantus firmus in the closing chorale, trombone (Tb) to reinforce the bass in the opening chorus, two oboes d'amore (Oa), two violins (Vl), viola (Va), and basso continuo. The autograph score bears the title: "Dominica 2 post Epiphanias / Ach Gott! Wie manches Hertzeleyd. / à / 4 Voci. / 2 Hautb: d'Amour / 2 Violini / Viola. / e Continuo / di J. S. Bach", which means "Sunday 2 after Epiphany ... for four voices, 2 oboes d'amore, 2 violins, viola and continuo by J. S. Bach".

In the following table of the movements, the scoring and keys follow the Neue Bach-Ausgabe. The keys and time signatures are taken from the book on all cantatas by the Bach scholar Alfred Dürr, using the symbol for common time (4/4). The continuo, played throughout, is not shown.

Music 
Bach uses a melody of "" which appeared first in the Lochamer-Liederbuch. The melody appears in the opening chorus, sung by the bass as a cantus firmus, in the second movement, as a four-part setting with interspersed recitatives, and in the closing chorale.

1 

Its mood of lamentation is supported by "elegiac sounds" of the oboes d'amore, sighing motifs in the strings, and the upper voices reflecting the oboe motifs. John Eliot Gardiner, who conducted the Bach Cantata Pilgrimage in 2000, notes that Bach used a repeated motif of six notes in chromatic descent, which is often used in chaconnes of the Baroque opera to express grief. The motif is used for the instrumental opening, each entry of a voice, interludes and conclusion.

2 
The recitative, "" (How difficult it is for flesh and blood), combines the hymn tune sung by the four-part choir, with interpolated text sung by the soloists in turn. The lines of the hymn are separated by a joyful ostinato motif derived from the chorale tune. The musicologist Julian Mincham writes that the "hybrid recitative provides an excellent example of Bach's experiments of investing long texts with sustained musical interest".

3 
The bass aria, "" (Although I experience the fear and torment of Hell), is accompanied by the continuo.

4 
A tenor recitative, "" (My body and spirit might despair), expresses trust in Jesus to overcome despair.

5 
In the duet for soprano and alto, "" (When cares press upon me), in "bright E major", as the Bach scholar Christoph Wolff writes, the voices are embedded in a "dense quartet texture". He concludes that the movement "banishes human care by means of joyful singing". The Bach scholar Klaus Hofmann notes that the obbligato motif, which is later picked up by the voices, is played by the oboes d'amore and violin in unison, providing "a new and remarkable tone colour". Bach refers to the Cross, as mentioned in the text, by using a cross-motif in the melody and applying double sharp marked by a cross. The voices intensify words such as "dringen" (press) and "singen" (sing) by extended coloraturas.

6 
The closing chorale, "" (If my heart remains pure in faith), is a four-part setting. The choral melody, now in the soprano, is reinforced by a horn.

Recordings 

The selection is taken from the listing on the Bach-Cantatas website.

References

External links 
 
 Ach Gott, wie manches Herzeleid BWV 3; BC A 33 / Chorale cantata (2nd Sunday of Epiphany) Bach Digital
 BWV 3 Ach Gott, wie manches Herzeleid English translation. University of Vermont
 Luke Dahn: BWV 3.6 bach-chorales.com

Church cantatas by Johann Sebastian Bach
1725 compositions